Strong Style Evolved UK was a two-day professional wrestling event promoted by New Japan Pro-Wrestling (NJPW), in partnership with Revolution Pro Wrestling (RPW). It took place on June 30 and July 1, 2018 at Planet Ice Milton Keynes in Milton Keynes, Buckinghamshire, England and Planet Ice Altrincham in Altrincham, Greater Manchester, England. The event was streamed on demand on RPW on Demand and NJPW World.

The event was themed around Chaos versus Suzuki-gun matches and featured participation of wrestlers from both NJPW and RPW. Three RPW championships were defended, including the British Heavyweight Championship.

Production

Background
On March 25, 2018, NJPW held Strong Style Evolved at the Walter Pyramid in Long Beach, California, U.S. The following day on March 26, NJPW announced the follow up to Strong Style Evolved, Strong Style Evolved UK, occurring on June 30 and July 1. The event will be held in conjunction with NJPW's British partner RPW; the two promotions had established a working relationships in 2015 as a part of NJPW's "New IWGP Conception."

Tickets for the event were put on pre-sale on March 27 and 29. Tickets for meet-and-greets were also later put on sale.

On May 3, it was announced that Kazuchika Okada would take part in the event.  Later in May and June, it was announced that Tomohiro Ishii, Taiji Ishimori, Minoru Suzuki, Toru Yano, Yuji Nagata, Will Ospreay, Taichi, Jay White, Shota Umino, Zack Sabre Jr., Takashi Iizuka, and NJPW LA Dojo graduate Dan Duggan would be participating at the event.

The event will air on the NJPW World and RPW On Demand streaming services, and will feature English commentary from Kevin Kelly.

On June 11, NJPW and RPW began revealing matches for the event.

Storylines
At Dominion 6.9 in Osaka-jo Hall, the Suzuki-gun team of Minoru Suzuki and Zack Sabre Jr. defeated the Chaos team of Tomohiro Ishii and Toru Yano. After the match Suzuki and Ishii had a confrontation, which set up a British Heavyweight Championship match for this event.

At Sakura Genesis, Kazuchika Okada successfully defended the IWGP Heavyweight Championship in the main event against Zack Sabre Jr. A rematch was then scheduled for this event.

As a preview for both these matches, the first night featured a tag team match for the Undisputed British Tag Team Championship between the teams of Suzuki/Sabre Jr. and Okada/Ishii.

Jay White's opponent in his night 2 match was scheduled to be Chris Brookes. However, Brookes fell ill and had to be replaced by Kyle Fletcher.

Results

Night 1

Night 2

See also

Professional wrestling in the United Kingdom

References

External links 

Revolution Pro Wrestling
New Japan Pro-Wrestling shows
Events in England
Professional wrestling in England
2018 in professional wrestling
2018 in England
June 2018 events in the United Kingdom
July 2018 events in the United Kingdom